The École nationale des sciences appliquées de Fès(ENSAF) is a public engineering school located in Fez, part of the national network of schools of applied sciences-ENSA of Morocco. It was created in 2005 and follows a 5 year course structure.

Programs offered
Computer engineering
Telecommunication and Networks engineering
Industrial engineering
Mechanical engineering and automate systems.
Embedded systems and industrial computing.

External links
 Site officiel

Education in Morocco
Buildings and structures in Fez, Morocco
Engineering universities and colleges